Logorrhea or logorrhoea may refer to:

Logorrhea (psychology), a communication disorder resulting in incoherent talkativeness
Logorrhea or verbosity, speech or writing which is deemed to use an excess of words